Alexander Gardens was one of the first urban public parks in Moscow, Russia.

History

Until the 18th century, the Neglinnaya River flowed on the site of Alexandrovsky Gardens, over which four bridges were built. Historically, folk festivals were held on the river banks, its water was clean and famous for fishing.  After the end of the Napoleonic Wars, Emperor Alexander I decided to take the river underground and enclose it in a pipe three kilometres long. Gardens were laid out in the vacated place, designed by the architect Osip Bove as part of a plan to restore Moscow after the fire of 1812.

The gardens were built from 1819 to 1823 and were originally called the Kremlin Gardens. After the coronation of Alexander II in 1856, the gardens were renamed the Alexander Gardens.

Layout

Upper Garden
Towards the main entrance to the park is the Tomb of the Unknown Soldier with an eternal flame brought from the Field of Mars in Leningrad. Created in 1967, it contains the body of a soldier who fell during the Great Patriotic War at the kilometer 41 marker of Leningradskoe Shosse, the nearest point the forces of Nazi Germany penetrated towards Moscow. Post Number One, where the honor sentinels stand on guard, used to be located in front of Lenin's Mausoleum, but was moved to the Tomb of The Unknown Soldier in the 1990s.
The middle section of the upper garden contains a faux ruined grotto built underneath the Middle Arsenal Tower. Although not constructed until 1841, this was part of Bove's original design. The garden's cast iron gate and grille were designed to commemorate the Russian victories over Napoleon, and its rocks are rubble from buildings destroyed during the French occupation of Moscow.

In front of the grotto is an obelisk erected on July 10, 1914, a year after the tercentenary of the Romanov dynasty was celebrated.  The monument made of granite from Finland listed all of the Romanov Tsars and had the coats of arms of the (Russian) provinces. Four years later, the dynasty was gone, and the Bolsheviks (per Lenin’s directive on Monumental propaganda) removed the imperial eagle, and re-carved the monument with a list of 19 socialist and communist philosophers and political leaders, personally approved by Lenin.  Originally in the Lower Garden, it was relocated to its present location in 1966.  There is discussion to remove Lenin's and reinstall an obelisk duplicating the original.

The wrought iron grille, enclosing this part of the garden, has a design of fasces, which are intended to commemorate the military victory over Napoleon.

The northern part of the garden is adjacent to the large underground shopping complex at Manege Square.

Middle Garden
The most prominent feature of the Middle Garden is the outlying Kutafya Tower of the Moscow Kremlin.  There is an entrance to the park opposite the tower directly to the Moscow Metro system.

Lower Garden
Laid out in 1823, the Lower Garden stretches to the road leading to the Borovitskaya Tower, one of two vehicular and pedestrian entrances to the Kremlin.

References

External links 
 

Parks and gardens in Moscow
Urban public parks
Cultural heritage monuments of federal significance in Moscow